Jonathan Ogden Moseley (April 9, 1762 – September 9, 1838) was a member of the U.S. House of Representatives from Connecticut. He was born in East Haddam, Connecticut, the only child of Thomas Moseley, a physician, and Phebe Ogden. He graduated from Yale College in 1780, studied law, was admitted to the bar and began practice in East Haddam.

Moseley was a member of the State house of representatives from 1794 to 1804 and served as justice of the peace of East Haddam from 1794 to 1817. He also served as state's attorney of Middlesex County from 1801 to 1805, and was colonel of the Twenty-fourth Regiment of the Connecticut Militia in 1802.

He was elected as a Federalist to the Ninth and to the seven succeeding Congresses (March 4, 1805 – March 3, 1821). After leaving Congress he moved to Saginaw, Michigan, and continued the practice of law until his death in 1838.

External links

1762 births
1838 deaths
People from East Haddam, Connecticut
American people of English descent
Federalist Party members of the United States House of Representatives from Connecticut
Democratic-Republican Party members of the United States House of Representatives from Connecticut
Members of the Connecticut House of Representatives
Yale College alumni